Cuban nobility encompasses all the individuals and families recognized in Cuba as members of the aristocratic class, hence possessing inheritance privileges.

History

The 19th century Spanish Empire saw much of its power weakened by its rival countries (the United Kingdom and France), it also saw many of its colonies in America being influenced by the republican ideologies of the recently independent United States. In an effort to strengthen its holdings, the Spanish Crown decided to grant titles of nobility to much of the colonial aristocracy. This bestowing of royal grace made the recipients loyal to the Crown, and more assimilated to the Iberian titled nobility. No other Spanish colony received as many grants of noble titles as Cuba, a jewel of the late Spanish Empire.

The Cuban aristocracy had always attempted to create a second Paris or Madrid in its main cities of Havana, Matanzas and Santiago de Cuba. Elegant, rich decorated manors, governmental buildings, opera houses, play houses, palaces, etc. covered the streets of the capital. The Spanish Crown was not the only entity to award titles of nobility, the Catholic Church made use of its authority to also award titles in the island. Families, through marriage and inheritance, also bore European titles, such as those from France, Italy (including the former Kingdom of Naples and the Two Sicilies) as well as Germany.

The non-Royal titles issued in Cuba follow the Spanish designation and resembled those of continental Europe. They were those of: Duke (Duque), Marquis (Marqués), Count (Conde), Viscount (Vizconde), Baron (Barón), Lord (Señor)—in that order of importance and social standing. The title of Grandee of Spain was usually annexed to another noble title but may also be bestowed on a person without a traditional noble title, in the last case the person would have Grandee of Spain written after his name; all Grandees are addressed as Excellency, the title being equal to that of a Duke and all Dukes are Grandees. Titles bestowed often had the name of a place in Cuba (e.g. Marqués de Pinar del Rio, Conde de Yumurí), the surname of the family (e.g. Marqués de Azpesteguia, Conde de Casa (house) Montalvo) or in remembrance of some Royal favor or deed (e.g. Marqués de la Gratitud, Marqués de la Real Proclamación).

After the revolution of 1898, many of these nobles stayed in the island, or moved to other former Spanish colonies, such as Puerto Rico; some returned to Spain. Although the new Republic of Cuba did not give itself the power to create and bestow new titles of nobility, it did not interfere with the already established tradition. Many families who possessed noble titles continued to use them, and the public respected their historical meaning and social position.

This all changed when Cuban Revolution took place on the island; soon the Communist government moved against these nobles, forcing many to return to Spain or into exile in the United States.

The last titled nobleman to live in Cuba, Don Ignacio Ponce de León y Ponce de León, Marqués de Aguas Claras and Count de Casa Ponce de León y Maroto died in La Habana in 1973 leaving a remaining descendant.

List of noble titles bestowed by Spanish Monarchs or inherited by Cubans
   Duque de Mola, (Grandee of Spain) (title canceled in 2022)
   Duque de la Torre, (Grandee of Spain)
   Duque de la Union de Cuba, (Grandee of Spain)
   Marqués de Aguas Claras
   Marqués de Aguero
   Marqués de Almendares
   Marqués de Alta Gracia
   Marqués de Arcos
   Marqués de Arguelles
   Marqués de Aviles
   Marqués de Azpezteguia
   Marqués de Balboa
   Marqués de Bayamo
   Marqués de Bellamar
   Marqués de Bellavista
   Marqués de Campo Florido
   Marqués de la Candelaria de Yarayabo
   Marqués de Cardenas de Montehermoso
   Marqués de Casa Calvo
   Marqués de Casa Enrile
   Marqués de Casa Montalvo
   Marqués de Casa Nuñez de Villavicencio y Jura Real
   Marqués de Casa Peñalver
   Marqués de Casa Sandoval
   Marqués de Casa Torres
   Marques de Casa Vidal
   Marqués de Cienfuegos
   Marqués de las Delicias de Tempu
   Marqués de Diana
   Marqués de Du-Quesne
   Marqués de Esteva de las Delicias
   Marqués de Garcillan
   Marqués de la Gratitud
   Marqués de Guaimaro
   Marqués de Guisa
   Marqués de la Habana, (Grandee of Spain)
   Marqués de Justiz de Santa Ana
   Marqués de Marianao
   Marqués de Montsalud
   Marqusé del Morro
   Marqués de Pinar del Rio
   Marqués de Placetas
   Marqués de Prado Ameno
   Marqués de O'Gavan
   Marqués de O'Reilly
   Marqués de Real Agrado
   Marqués de la Real Campina
   Marqués de la Real Proclamación
   Marqués del Real Socorro
   Marqués de las Regueras
   Marqués de San Carlos de Pedroso
   Marqués de San Felipe y Santiago de Bejucal
   Marqués de San Miguel de Bejucal
   Marqués de Santa Ana y Santa Maria
   Marqués de Santa Lucia
   Marqués de Santa Olalla
   Marqués de Santa Rosa
   Marqués de Tiedra
   Marqués de Valero de Urria
   Marqués de las Victoria de las Tunas
   Marqués de Villamejor
   Marqués de Villa Siciliana
   Conde de Asalto
   Conde de Bayona
   Conde de Campo Alegre
   Conde de Canimar
   Conde de Casa Barreto
   Conde de Casa Bayona
   Conde de Casa Brunet
   Conde de Casa Lombillo
   Conde de Casa Pedroso y Barro
   Conde de Casa Miró
   Conde de Casa Montalvo
   Conde de Casa More
   Conde de Casa Ponce de Leon y Maroto
   Conde de Casa Romero
   Conde del Castillo de Cuba, (Grandee of Spain)
   Conde de Cuba
   Conde de Diana
   Conde de Fernandina de Jagua, (Grandee of Spain)
   Conde de Galarza
   Conde de Gibacoa
   Conde de Ibanez
   Conde de Lagunillas
   Conde de Macuriges
   Conde de Mandan
   Conde de la Montera
   Conde de Morales
   Conde de O'Reilly
   Conde de Peñalver
   Conde de Pozos Dulces
   Conde del Puente
   Conde de Revilla de Camargo
   Conde de la Reunion de Cuba
   Conde de Sagunto
   Conde de San Fernando de Peñalver
   Conde de San Ignacio
   Conde de San Juan de Jaruco
   Conde de San Rafael de Luyano
   Conde de Santa Clara
   Conde de Santa Cruz de Mopox, (Grandee of Spain)
   Conde de Santa Inez
   Conde de Santa Maria de Loreto
   Conde de Santovenia
   Conde de Vallellano
   Conde de Venadito
   Conde de Vidal
   Conde de Villanueva, (Grandee of Spain)
   Conde de Yumurí
   Conde de Zaldivar
   Vizconde de la Bahia Honda de la Real Fedelidad
   Vizconde de Canet del Mar
   Vizconde de Cuba
   Vizconde de los Remedios
   Vizconde de Santa Clara
   Vizconde de Valvanera
   Baron de Maials

References

External links 
 Titles of Nobility Cuba 1958
 Titles dropped by Cubans (New York Times)

 
Titles of nobility in the Americas
Nobility of the Americas
Spanish colonial period of Cuba